Anthony Capozzi may refer to:

Anthony P. Capozzi (born 1945), American trial attorney and political consultant
Anthony Capozzi (wrongful conviction)